The 125th Street station was an express station on the demolished IRT Ninth Avenue Line in Manhattan, New York City. It had three tracks and two island platforms. It opened on September 17, 1879 and closed on June 11, 1940. The next southbound stop was 116th Street for all trains. The next northbound local stop was 130th Street. The next northbound express stop was 145th Street.

References

External links 
NYCsubway.org - The IRT Ninth Avenue Elevated Line-Polo Grounds Shuttle

IRT Ninth Avenue Line stations
Railway stations in the United States opened in 1879
Railway stations closed in 1940
Former elevated and subway stations in Manhattan
1879 establishments in New York (state)
1940 disestablishments in New York (state)